In January 2020, 74.4% of the population of Denmark were registered members of the Church of Denmark, the officially established church, which is Protestant in classification and Lutheran in orientation. This is down 0.6% compared to the year earlier and 1.2% down compared to two years earlier. Despite the high membership figures, only 3% of the population regularly attend Sunday services, and only 19% of Danes consider religion to be an important part of their life.

Religiosity 
According to a Eurobarometer Poll conducted in 2010, 28% of Danish citizens responded that "they believe there is a God", 47% responded that "they believe there is some sort of spirit or life force" and 24% responded that "they do not believe there is any sort of spirit, God or life force". Another poll, carried out in 2008, found that 25% of Danes believe Jesus is the son of God, and 18% believe he is a messenger of the God and saviour of the world but not son of God A gallup report in 2009 found that only 19% of Danes consider religion to be an important part of their life.

Just under 20% of the Danish population identifies as atheist.

Christianity 

Christianity is the predominant religion of Denmark, with three quarters of the Danish population estimated as adherents of the "Folkekirken" ("People's Church"), Denmark's national Lutheran church. Aside from Lutheranism, there is a small Catholic minority, as well as small Protestant denominations such as the Baptist Union of Denmark and the Reformed Synod of Denmark.

According to official statistics from January 2019, 74.7% of the population of Denmark are members of the Evangelical Lutheran Church of Denmark, if you only look at the part of the Danish population that has Danish origins, the decline of membership has been less marked: here there has been a decline in the proportion who are members of the Danish National Church, from approx. 90% in 1985 to 75.9% in 2017. the country's state church since the Reformation in Denmark–Norway and Holstein, and designated "the Danish people's church" by the 1848 Constitution of Denmark.

There are around 8,000 Christians who have converted from a Muslim background in the country, most of them belonging to some form of Protestantism.

Minor religions

Buddhism

Buddhism in Denmark was brought back from expeditions that explored the Indian subcontinent. Initial interest was mainly from intellectuals, authors, Buddhologists and Philologists. In 1921, Christian F. Melbye founded the first Buddhist Society in Denmark, but it was later dissolved in 1950 before his death in 1953. In the 1950s, there was a revival in interest towards Buddhism, especially Tibetan Buddhism and Hannah and Ole Nydahl, founded the first Karma Kagyu Buddhist centers in Copenhagen. The third wave of Buddhism came in the 1980s, when refugees from Vietnam, Sri Lanka and China came to Denmark.

In 2009 Aarhus University estimated that there were 20,000 practising Buddhists in Denmark.

Judaism 

A Jewish community has been present in Denmark since the seventeenth century, when the monarchs began allowing Jews to enter the country and practice their religion on an individual basis. Emancipation followed gradually and by the end of the nineteenth century most Jews were fully assimilated into Danish society. In the early decades of the twentieth century there was an influx of more secular, Yiddish speaking, Eastern European Jews. Nearly 99% of Danish Jews survived the Holocaust, in part due to the actions of the Danish resistance, and to the Swedish authorities' offer of asylum to the Danish Jews.

Today there are approximately 6,000 ethnic Jews in Denmark, 1700 of them being members of the official organization The Jewish Community in Denmark. There are three synagogues located in Copenhagen.

Islam 

According to Danish researcher Brian Arly Jacobsen, Muslims living in Denmark make up ca. 256,000 people or approximately 4.4% of the population in 2020 and form the country's second largest religious community and largest minority religion. As of 2017 there were 28 recognised Muslim communities and around 185 mosques in Denmark. Ahmadis constructed the first mosque in the capital, Copenhagen. There were approximately 655 Ahmadis all over Denmark in 2006.

According to a survey of various religions and denominations undertaken by the Danish Foreign Ministry, other religious groups comprise less than 1% of the population individually and approximately 2% when taken all together.

Baha'i Faith

The Baha'i Faith arrived in Denmark in 1925, but it did not make much impact until the arrival of American pioneers in 1946. A National Spiritual Assembly was formed in 1962. In 2005, it was estimated that there were about 1,251 Baha'is in the country.

Hinduism 

In Denmark there are about 7,500-8,000 Hindus of Tamil origin, both from India and Sri Lanka. The Hindu Community in Denmark is registered as reported in International Religious Freedom Report 2006, Denmark.

Sikhism 

In Denmark there are about 4,000 Sikhs of Punjabi origin.

Neopaganism
A neopagan religious group, Forn Siðr — Ásatrú and Vanatrú Association in Denmark, describes itself as a revival of the Norse paganism prevalent in Denmark before Christianization. It gained state recognition in November 2003. There are about 500 registered heathens (0.01% of the population) adhering to the old Norse beliefs.

In 2016, the designer Jim Lyngvild established the heathen building Manheim in Korinth on Funen.

Politics and government 
Politicians in Denmark will not generally be found making use of any religious rhetoric or arguments in their declarations, and this is especially the case for government ministers, with the possible, occasional exception of the Minister for Ecclesiastical Affairs in the course of his or her duties. Four of Denmark's prime ministers have identified themselves as atheists.

The Christian Democrats is the only major political party to regularly employ religious rhetoric and arguments, and they have not been represented in the Folketing since 2001, as they have not been able to acquire the minimum 2% of the votes needed to secure representation.

Danish Constitution

The Constitution of Denmark contains a number of sections related to religion.
 §4 establishes the Evangelical Lutheran Church of Denmark as the state church of Denmark.
 §6 requires the Danish monarch to be a member of the state church.
 §67 grants freedom of worship.
 §68 states that no one is required to personally contribute to any form of religion other than his own. As state subsidies are not considered personal contributions the Church of Denmark receives subsidies – according to §4 – beyond the church tax paid by the members of the church. The Church of Denmark is the only religious group to receive direct financial support from the state. Other religious groups can receive indirect support through tax deductions on contributions.
 §70 grants freedom of religion by ensuring civil and political rights can not be revoked due to race or religious beliefs. It further states race and religious beliefs can not be used to be exempt from civil duties.
 §71 ensures no one can be imprisoned due to religious beliefs.

See also

Christianization of Scandinavia
Buddhism in Denmark
Bahá'í Faith in Denmark
Islam in Denmark
Jyllands-Posten Muhammad cartoons controversy
History of the Jews in Denmark
Rescue of the Danish Jews
Hinduism in Denmark
Religion in the Faroe Islands
Religion in Greenland

Notes

References

External links
 denmark.net Religion in Denmark

 
Christianity in Denmark
Danish culture